The Empire Award for Best British Actor was an Empire Award presented annually by the British film magazine Empire to honor a British actor who has delivered an outstanding performance in a leading role while working within the film industry. The Empire Award for Best British Actor was first introduced at the 1st Empire Awards ceremony in 1996 with Ewan McGregor receiving the award for his role in Shallow Grave and last presented at the 10th Empire Awards ceremony in 2005. It was one of three Best British awards retired that year (the others being Best British Actress and Best British Director). Winners were voted by the readers of Empire magazine.

Since its inception, the award has been given to six actors. Ewan McGregor had received the most awards in this category with four awards and was nominated on seven occasions, more than any other actor. Paddy Considine was the last winner in this category for his role in Dead Man's Shoes.

Winners and nominees
In the list below, winners are listed first in boldface, followed by the other nominees. The number of the ceremony (1st, 2nd, etc.) appears in parentheses after the awards year, linked to the article (if any) on that ceremony.

1990s

2000s

Multiple awards and nominations

Multiple awards
The following individuals received two or more Best British Actor awards:

Multiple nominations
The following individuals received two or more Best British Actor nominations:

References

External links

Actor
Film awards for lead actor